Alvinella is a genus of annelids belonging to the family Alvinellidae.

The species of this genus are found in Southeastern Asia and Northern America.

Species:

Alvinella caudata 
Alvinella pompejana

References

Annelids